The following highways are numbered 846:

United States